Cathorops belizensis, the Belize sea catfish, is a species of sea catfish. It is found in mangrove channels in Belize City. Maximum recorded body length is 32 cm.

References

Ariidae
Fish described in 2008